The XEL-1 is the world's first organic light-emitting diode (OLED) television, designed by Sony in 2007 and produced for sale the following year. It was also the world's thinnest television during its production, at 3 mm. It has a screen size of 11 inches with a native resolution 960×540. As the screen is too thin for I/O ports and buttons, Sony has connected the screen to a non-detachable base that contains it. The top of the base has 2 speakers and the power, volume, channel, input, and menu buttons, which are backlit, so the symbols and abbreviations change when the XMB interface is accessed. The back of the panel has a DMeX service input, a 16-volt DC input, a VHF/UHF/cable input, a Memory Stick slot, and two HDMI inputs. On the left side of the panel there is an analog/digital audio output. 

The XEL-1 has a contrast ratio of 1,000,000:1, high color saturation, large viewing angles, high screen uniformity, and low power consumption. On the other hand, it has poor primary color accuracy, a quarter of the full HD resolution (1920×1080), no anti-judder processing, a light-reflective screen, few inputs, a non-detachable panel, a small screen and a MSRP of US$2,499.99. It was sold in the United States, Canada, Russia, Japan, Europe and Australia. Years later in 2017, Sony officially sold their first OLED TV in market, the BRAVIA OLED A1/A1E with 4K HDR.

Specifications

General 
Aspect ratio: 16:9
Screen size: 11 inches measured diagonally
Television type: OLED flat panel
Color: Black
Auto SAP
Closed Caption (CC): Yes
ID-1 Detection: Yes
Xross Media Bar
Favorite Channel
 Weight:

Video 
Contrast ratio: 1,000,000:1
Native resolution: 960 x 540
Picture adjustment: Mode, Reset, Picture, Brightness, Color, Hue, Color Temperature, Sharpness, Noise Reduction, and MPEG Noise Reduction
Advanced settings: Black Corrector, Gamma, Clear White, Color Space, and Live Color
Tuner: NTSC, CATV, ATSC, and Clear QAM1
Display technology: OLED
Accepted video signals: 480i, 480p, 720p, 1080i/60, and 1080p/60
CineMotion reverse 3:2 pulldown technology: Auto
Comb filter: 3D digital
Picture modes: Vivid, Standard, and Custom
Wide mode: Wide Zoom, Normal, Full, and Zoom
Light sensor
Noise reduction

Audio 
Power output: 2W (2 x 1W)
Sound effect: S-Force Front Surround
Class D amplifier
Steady Sound
Sound Booster
Dolby Digital: AC3 for ATSC
MTS Stereo decoder
A/V Synch
Sound mode: Dynamic, Standard, and Custom

Inputs and outputs 
RF connector input: 1 (rear)
Memory Stick media slot: Memory Stick PRO (not available for the UK model)
Digital audio output (optical)
Headphone output: 1 (side)
HDMI connection inputs: 2 (rear), supports 1080p/60, CEC capable
Ethernet jack (Japanese model only)

Reception
The XEL-1 received a positive review from CNET, however, it also received mixed reviews from customers who bought it.

References

External links
XEL-1 Support sony.com

Television technology
Sony products
OLED televisions